The International Centre for Sport Security (ICSS) is an international, not-for-profit organisation based in Doha, Qatar. It was established in 2010 and formally launched in March 2011, with a global mission to promote and protect the integrity and security of sport.
The ICSS's key activities include advisory, training and research. It works primarily with organising committees, governments, bidding nations, infrastructure owners, sport associations leagues and clubs.

Organization
In 2013 the ICSS was led by President Mohammed Hanzab, a former lieutenant colonel in the Qatar Armed Forces, and Director General Helmut Spahn. Mohammed Al Hajri is Vice President.  At that time the Centre's staff included Heinz Palme, Vice Director General, Massimiliano Montanari, Chief of Cabinet, Shaun McCarthy, ICSS Enterprise, Emanuel Macedo de Medeiros, ICSS Europe and Latin America, Chris Eaton, Sport Integrity, Malcolm Tarbitt, Safety and Security, and Karen Webb, Communications and PR  The Centre's policies and direction are developed by an advisory board which includes Juliette Kayyem, an Obama administration appointee who served as assistant secretary at the Department of Homeland Security.

Activities
The ICSS works to improve security, safety and integrity in sport by addressing real issues and providing world-leading services, skills, networks and knowledge. It also focuses on match-fixing and sports results manipulation.

MENA region stakeholder meeting
The MENA Region stakeholder meeting addresses the issue of sport protection in the Middle-East and North Africa. The meeting is jointly organised by UNICRI and the ICSS, the first of which, was held in Doha, Qatar on 17 March 2013, hosted and opened by Sheikh Abdullah bin Nasser bin Khalifa Al Thani, Minister of State for Interior Affairs in Qatar. Attendees included high-level representatives of the United Nations, the League of Arab States, the European Commission, the Organization of American States, and several governmental authorities from countries around the world.

Present at the first meeting in March 2013 were Sheikh Saoud Bin Abdulrahman Al Thani, Secretary General of Qatar Olympic Committee; Staffan de Mistura, former Special Representative of the Secretary-General in Iraq and Afghanistan, and Personal Representative of the Secretary-General for Southern Lebanon;. Stefano Manservisi, Director-General for Home Affairs, European Commission; Amb. Adam Blackwell, Secretary of Multidimensional Security of the Organization of American States; and Sir David Veness, former United Nations Under-Secretary General for Safety and Security.

Save the Dream programme

The Save the Dream campaign was launched by Sheikh Saoud Bin Abdulrahman Al-Thani (Secretary General, Qatar Olympic Committee), Mohammed Hanzab (President, ICSS), and Italian football player Alessandro del Piero as Captain of the Athletes' Board. The first overseas offices of Save the Dream were opened in May 2013 at Alessandro del Piero's Academy in Turin, Italy.

The stated intention of the campaign is to alert young athletes to the consequences of sports results manipulation, with a panel of high-profile athletes from different sports and regions around the world being set up, and a multidisciplinary team of world experts in education, communications, sport management and sport integrity. Securing Sport 2013 saw the unveiling of the Save the Dream logo and the first Save the Dream Award being given to Spanish runner Iván Fernández Anaya for good sportsmanship.

International Sport Security Conference

This annual conference, hosted by ICSS, focuses on sport security. The Conference is held in Doha, Qatar.

The first conference took place in March 2011. Speakers included Lord John Stevens, William J. Bratton, Rick Parry, Sir Ronald Flanagan, Leonard McCarthy and Michael Johnson. The second conference was held on 14–15 March 2012 in Doha with the theme "Creating a platform for growth through safe sporting events".  Venues included the Qatar National Convention Centre, the Torch Hotel and the Museum of Islamic Art.  Speakers included Khoo Boon Hui, David Dein Danny Jordaan, Bernard Lapasset, Haroon Lorgat, Michael E. Porter. Dave Richards, Tim Sebastian, Helmut Spahn, and John Stevens At the 2014 conference World Anti-Doping Agency director David Howman gave a talk about criminal activity in organized sport.

References

External links
 Official ICSS website
 Official Securing Sport Conference website
 Official ICSS Journal website
 Official ICSS Knowledge Portal website
 Sports corruption watchdog group faces questions about its backer Qatar
 Qatar group to push sports integrity in US even as World Cup award faces probes

Sports organizations established in 2010
Sports organisations of Qatar
Non-profit organisations based in Qatar
2010 establishments in Qatar
Organisations based in Doha